Balcı (formerly Cücü) is a village in Bor district of Niğde Province, Turkey. At  it is situated in the southern slopes of Melendiz Mountain. The population of Balcı is 777 as of 2011. The village was founded in the Middle Ages by a rebellious commander of Karamanoğlu Beylik (a Turkmen principality between 13th-15thy centuries) in a remote valley of the mountain. But  In 1940s the village was relocated following an earthquake. Main economic activities of the village are agriculture and beehiving. ( Bal means "honey") . Cereals, sugar beet and fodder are the crops of the village.

References 

Villages in Bor District, Niğde